Trichaeta tigrina is a moth in the subfamily Arctiinae. It was described by Francis Walker in 1865. It is found in Cambodia.

References

Moths described in 1865
Arctiinae